Utricularia blackmanii is a terrestrial carnivorous plant belonging to the genus Utricularia (family Lentibulariaceae). It is known only from northern Queensland, Australia, where it has been recorded from elevations of 200–900 m above sea level.

See also 
 List of Utricularia species

References 

Carnivorous plants of Australia
Flora of Queensland
blackmanii
Lamiales of Australia
North Queensland